The Lexington–Fayette metropolitan area is the 109th-largest metropolitan statistical area (MSA) in the United States. It was originally formed by the United States Census Bureau in 1950 and consisted solely of Fayette County until 1980 when surrounding counties saw increases in their population densities and the number of their residents employed within Lexington–Fayette, which led to them meeting Census criteria to be added to the MSA.

The Lexington–Fayette MSA is the primary MSA of the Lexington–Fayette–Richmond–Frankfort combined statistical area which includes the Micropolitan Statistical Areas of Frankfort (Franklin and Anderson counties), Mount Sterling (Montgomery, Bath, and Menifee counties), and Richmond–Berea (Madison and Rockcastle counties). The Lexington–Fayette–Frankfort–Richmond combined statistical area has a July 1, 2012 Census Bureau estimated population of 703,271.

Demographics

Cities

The following is a list of cities in the Lexington–Fayette metropolitan area with 2021 United States Census Bureau estimates of their population. Cities in bold are considered principal cities of the metropolitan area by the Census Bureau, which represent significant employment centers:

Lexington – 321,793
 Georgetown – 37,730
 Nicholasville – 31,490
 Winchester – 19,071
 Versailles – 10,431
 Paris – 10,209
 Wilmore – 6,027
 Midway – 1,690
 Stamping Ground – 796
 Millersburg – 744
 North Middletown – 603
 Sadieville – 326
 Corinth – 229

Counties

• Populations are based on published estimates by the United States Bureau of the Census.

¹County was not a part of Lexington–Fayette MSA at the time of this Census and the county's population is not included in MSA total.

References

External links
Lexington–Fayette–Frankfort–Richmond combined statistical area (2003) map
U.S. Census Bureau State & County QuickFacts

About Metropolitan and Micropolitan Statistical Areas
Historical Metropolitan Area Definitions